Maccabi Petah Tikva F.C. (Full name: "Maccabi Avshalom Ironi Petah Tikva F.C.) is an Israeli football club based in the city of Petah Tikva. It is part of the Maccabi World Union for international Jewish sports clubs. The team promoted to first division at 2019/20 after only one season in second division (Liga Leumit).

History
The club was founded in 1912 by a group of Jewish students from Petah Tikva, who were studying in the Ottoman city of Constantinople (many of them would later serve in the Ottoman army during World War I), making it the second oldest Jewish football club in Israel after Maccabi Tel Aviv, which was formed in 1906.

In 1921, after the death of founder member Avshalom Gisin during the 1921 Palestine riots, the club added his name to the club's name, and the club was named "Maccabi Avshalom Petah Tikva".

In 1927, the club moved to the Maccabi Petah Tikva Ground, where they would play until the 1970s. In 1935 they won their first piece of silverware, beating Hakoah Tel Aviv 1–0 in the cup final. In 1939 they reached the final again, but lost 2–1 to Hapoel Tel Aviv. The following year they won the Haaretz tournament.

The club was included in the new Israeli League in 1949, and finished fifth in the inaugural post-independence league table. In the next season (1951–52 – there was no 1950–51 edition) they finished as runners-up to champions Maccabi Tel Aviv and also won the State Cup, beating Maccabi Tel Aviv 1–0. In 1953–54 (1952–53 was also not played) they also finished second with Eliezer Spiegel finishing as the league's top goalscorer on 16 goals from 22 matches.

After several seasons of mid-table finishes, Maccabi finished bottom of the table in 1962–63 (a season in which the club were deducted 3 points due to suspicions of bribery during a game with Maccabi Jaffa) and were due to be relegated to Liga Alef. However, the Israel Football Association decided to expand the league from 12 to 15 clubs and they were spared demotion. However, the club was relegated at the end of the 1965–66 season after finishing second from bottom.

After two seasons in Liga Alef (one of which – 1966–68 Liga Leumit – lasted for two years) the club returned to the top division in 1969. At the end of the 1970–71 season the club was relegated again after finishing second from bottom, but made an immediate return as Liga Alef champions.

Although Maccabi finished bottom in 1974–75, they were again reprieved from relegation due to league expansion. However, after a repeat performance in 1976–77 they did go down. After making another immediate return to the top flight, the club maintained several mid-table finishes, before ending the 1987–88 season bottom of the table.

In 1990 and 1991 the club won the Liga Artzit Toto Cup. They returned to the top division in 1991 and have remained there since. In 1995 the club won the top division's Toto Cup for the first time, a feat repeated in 2000 and 2004.

In 2001 the club reached the cup final for the first time in 49 years, losing 3–0 to Maccabi Tel Aviv. In 2003–04 they finished third, qualifying for the UEFA Cup. However, the home leg of their third qualifying round tie against SC Heerenveen was cancelled by UEFA due to a baggage handlers strike, and they lost the away leg 5–0.

In 2004–05 the club finished second in the league and qualified for the UEFA Cup again. This time they were more successful, beating Macedonian side FK Baskimi 11–0 on aggregate, before knocking out Partizan Belgrade (with a 5–2 away win carrying them through despite a 2–0 loss at home). However, in the group stage they finished bottom having lost all four matches.

Players

Current squad
 As of 31 January 2023

Out on loan

Retired numbers

 4  – Murad Magomedov, Center back, Played in club 1995–2013.

Foreigners 2022–23
Only up six non-Israeli nationals can be in an Israeli club squad (only five can play at the same time). Those with Jewish ancestry, married to an Israeli or have played in Israel for an extended period of time, can claim a passport or permanent residency which would allow them to play with Israeli status.
  Gideon Akaouwa

Stadium

The club played at the Maccabi Petah Tikva ground between 1926 and the 1970s. Since they left the old Maccabi Petah Tikva ground they shared the 6,768-capacity Petah Tikva Municipal Stadium with city rivals Hapoel. At the end of 2011, the club moved to HaMoshava Stadium.

Notable coaches
 Eliezer Spiegel (1955 – 1957)
 Jack Fairbrother (1958 – 1959)
 Alexander Vogel (1959 – 1960)
 Eliezer Spiegel (1960 – 1961)
 Eli Fuchs (1961 – 1962)
 Emmanuel Scheffer (1962 – 1963) 
 Dror Kashtan (1991 – 1992)
 Yehoshua Feigenbaum (1994 – 1995)
 Moshe Sinai (June 1, 1997 – Feb 1, 1998)
 Eyal Lahman (1998 – 1999)
 Yossi Mizrahi (July 1, 1999 – June 30, 2001)
 Eli Ohana (Jan 1, 2001 – June 30, 2001)
 Guy Luzon (Jan 1, 2002 – June 30, 2007)
 Yossi Mizrahi (July 1, 2007 – Nov 5, 2007)
 Guy Luzon (Jan 16, 2008 – April 30, 2008)
 Guy Azouri (Aug 21, 2008 – Dec 23, 2008)
 Roni Levi (Dec 22, 2008 – Nov 21, 2009)
 Freddy David (Nov 22, 2009 – May 8, 2011)
 Marco Balbul (May 28, 2011 – Oct 17, 2011)
 Eyal Lahman (Oct 18, 2011 – Jan 21, 2012)
 Moshe Sinai (Jan 22, 2012 – Nov 24, 2013)
 Yitav Luzon (Nov 24, 2013 – 14)
 Kobi Refua (Dec 19, 2013 – 14)
 Ran Ben Shimon (June 11, 2014 – Feb 29, 2016)
 Dani Golan (Mar 2, 2016 – 16 May 2016)
 Kobi Refua (31 May 2016 – 17 September 2017)
 Sharon Mimer (17 September 2017 – 2018)
 Elisha Levy (23 May 2018 – 6 January 2019)
 Guy Luzon (20 January 2019 –)

Honours

League
Liga Artzit/Liga Leumit (second tier)
Champions: 1990–91, 2012–13, 2019–20

Cups
State Cup
Winners: 1935, 1951–52
Runners-up: 1925, 1939, 2000–01, 2019–20

League Cup
Runners-up: 1985

Toto Cup
Winners: 1994–95, 1999–2000, 2003–04, 2015–16
Runners-up: 2010–11

Toto Cup Artzit (second tier)
Winners: 1989–90, 1990–91

References

External links
Official website

 
Association football clubs established in 1912
Petah Tikva
Petah Tikva
1912 establishments in the Ottoman Empire
Sport in Petah Tikva